Life Is Full of Fun is a 2001 Russian drama film directed by Pyotr Todorovsky.

Plot 
The film takes place in a city near Moscow in a large communal apartment in which several families live, each of which has its own interests, troubles and joys, but their fates are associated with terrifying events taking place in the country.

Cast 
 Lyudmila Arinina
 Vladimir Kashpur
 Mariya Krasnikova
 Yury Kuznetsov
 Roman Madyanov
 Marina Mogilevskaya
 Nelli Nevedina
 Andrey Panin
 Elena Polyakova
 Irina Rozanova
 Vladimir Simonov	
 Larisa Udovichenko

References

External links 
 

2001 films
2000s Russian-language films
Russian drama films
2001 drama films